Al-Hasan Badr al-Din was the 20th Tayyibi Isma'ili Dāʿī al-Muṭlaq in Yemen.

Life
He succeeded his father Idris Imad al-Din in 1468, and held the post until his death in 1512, when he was succeeded by his brother al-Husayn Husam al-Din. Syedna Al-Hasan encouraged education and bestowed great favors on his students. He used to shower special attention on anyone who came from India.

His son, Muhammad Izz al-Din I, would succeed as the 23rd Dāʿī al-Muṭlaq in 1527, the last from the Banu al-Walid al-Anf family that had dominated the office since the early 13th century.

Death
Syedna Hasan had the longest reign among Dai of Yemen with a tenure of 45 years. He is buried in Masar, Yemen.

References

Sources
 
 

15th-century births
15th century in Yemen
16th century in Yemen
1512 deaths
Year of birth unknown
Banu al-Walid al-Anf
Tayyibi da'is
15th-century Arabs
16th-century Arabs
15th-century Ismailis
16th-century Ismailis
15th-century Islamic religious leaders
16th-century Islamic religious leaders